Master Class is a 1995 play by American playwright Terrence McNally, presented as a fictional master class by opera singer Maria Callas near the end of her life, in the 1970s. The play features incidental vocal music by Giuseppe Verdi, Giacomo Puccini, and Vincenzo Bellini. The play opened on Broadway in 1995, with stars Zoe Caldwell and Audra McDonald winning Tony Awards.

Plot
The opera diva Maria Callas, a glamorous, commanding, larger-than-life, caustic, and surprisingly funny pedagogue is holding a singing master class. Alternately dismayed and impressed by the students who parade before her, she retreats into recollections about the glories of her own life and career. Included in her musings are her younger years as an ugly duckling, her fierce hatred of her rivals, the unforgiving press that savaged her early performances, her triumphs at La Scala, and her relationship with Aristotle Onassis. It culminates in a monologue about sacrifice taken in the name of art.

Production history
The play originally was staged by the Philadelphia Theatre Company in March 1995, the Mark Taper Forum and the Kennedy Center.

The play premiered on Broadway at the John Golden Theatre on November 15, 1995 and closed on June 29, 1997 after 598 performances and twelve previews. Directed by Leonard Foglia, the original cast featured Zoe Caldwell (as Callas), Audra McDonald (as Sharon), Karen Kay Cody, David Loud, Jay Hunter Morris, and Michael Friel. Patti LuPone (from July 1996) and Dixie Carter (from January 1997) subsequently replaced Caldwell as Callas, Matthew Walley replaced Morris and Alaine Rodin replaced McDonald later in the run. LuPone played the role in the West End production at the Queens Theatre, opening in April 1997 (previews) and Faye Dunaway played the role in the U.S. national tour in 1996.

Master Class ran at the Kennedy Center from March 25, 2010 to April 18, 2010, directed by Stephen Wadsworth and starring Tyne Daly as Callas. The play was then revived on Broadway in a Manhattan Theatre Club production at the Samuel J. Friedman Theatre, running from June 14, 2011 (previews) to September 4, 2011 for 70 regular performances and 26 previews. Directed by Stephen Wadsworth, the cast featured Tyne Daly as Callas, with Sierra Boggess as Sharon and Alexandra Silber as Sophie. This production transferred to the West End at the Vaudeville Theatre from January to April 2012, with Daly as Callas and Naomi O'Connell as Sharon.

A 2010/11 UK touring production of the play, starred Stephanie Beacham as Callas

A production in Paris, Master Class – La leçon de chant (the singing lesson) in 1997 starred Fanny Ardant as Callas and was directed by Roman Polanski.

In 1997, Norma Aleandro played the role of Maria Callas at the Teatro Maipo in Buenos Aires directed by Agustín Alezzo. In 2012, Aleandro and Alezzo did a new version of the play.

An Australian production in 1997 starred Robyn Nevin as Callas. Nevin played the role in Brisbane and Sydney. Amanda Muggleton then played Callas in Adelaide in 1998 and Melbourne in 1999. Muggleton reprised the role in the 2001/02 Australian touring production and won the 2002 Helpmann Award for Best Actress in a Play.

Jelisaveta Seka Sablić played Callas in the 1997 production of the Bitef theater, before touring other Belgrade and Serbian theaters, and Switzerland in 2005. Soprano Radmila Smiljanić was a music supervisor. Sablić was awarded the Miloš Žutić Award for the role.

In 2014, Maria Mercedes brought the work to life again in Australia to critical acclaim: "It's an awe-inspiring performance by any measure." She was nominated for a number of awards, winning the Green Room Award for Female Performer for Independent Theatre. Her portrayal is the first time in professional theatre that a woman of Greek heritage has played Maria Callas. The production moved to Sydney in August 2015, before returning to Melbourne in September.

In 2018 and 2019 a production of Master Class took place in Athens, Greece, at the Dimitris Horn Theatre with Greek actress Maria Nafpliotou in the starring role. The production has also received critical acclaim and by February 2019 counted 125 consecutive sold out performances.

Critical reception
Ben Brantley, in his review of the 2011 Broadway revival for The New York Times wrote that, although Master Class is not "a very good play", he felt that Tyne Daly "transforms that script into one of the most haunting portraits I've seen of life after stardom."

Awards and nominations
Master Class won both the 1996 Drama Desk Award for Outstanding New Play and the 1996 Tony Award for Best Play. Zoe Caldwell won the 1996 Tony Award for Actress in a Play, and Audra McDonald won the 1996 Tony Award for Featured Actress in a Play.

The 2011 revival received a 2012 Tony Award nomination, Best Revival of a Play.

References

External links
 
 Master Class at Dramatists Play Service

1995 plays
Broadway plays
Drama Desk Award-winning plays
Plays by Terrence McNally
Tony Award-winning plays
Plays set in the 1970s
Plays set in the United States
Plays based on real people
Cultural depictions of Maria Callas